Turkana West is a constituency in Kenya. It is one of six constituencies of Turkana County.

References 

Constituencies in Turkana County